Victoria is a census-designated place and unincorporated community in Marshall County, Mississippi, United States. Its ZIP code is 38679.

In 1925, the Sunnyland passenger train derailed and tumbled down an embankment as it approached Victoria, killing 20.

It was first named as a CDP in the 2020 Census which listed a population of 1,066.

Demographics

2020 census

Note: the US Census treats Hispanic/Latino as an ethnic category. This table excludes Latinos from the racial categories and assigns them to a separate category. Hispanics/Latinos can be of any race.

References

Unincorporated communities in Marshall County, Mississippi
Unincorporated communities in Mississippi
Census-designated places in Marshall County, Mississippi